Kalvaitis (Kalvaitytė, Kalvaitienė) is a Lithuanian-language surname derived from the word kalvis, "blacksmith". Notable people with this surname include:

 (born 1927), Lithuanian ballet dancer and teacher 
 (1842-1900) one of the first Lithuanian professional musicians and composers
Paulina Radziulytė-Kalvaitienė (1905 – 1986), Lithuanian athlete and basketball player
Paulina Kalvaitytė, a founder of the Lithuanian Women's Council 

Lithuanian-language surnames